The Hunsdiecker reaction (also called the Borodin reaction or the Hunsdiecker–Borodin reaction) is a name reaction in organic chemistry whereby silver salts of carboxylic acids react with a halogen to produce an organic halide.  It is an example of both a decarboxylation and a halogenation reaction as the product has one fewer carbon atoms than the starting material (lost as carbon dioxide) and a halogen atom is introduced its place. A catalytic approach has been developed.

History
The reaction is named for Cläre Hunsdiecker and her husband Heinz Hunsdiecker, whose work in the 1930s developed it into a general method.
The reaction was first demonstrated by Alexander Borodin in his 1861 reports of the preparation of methyl bromide from silver acetate. Around the same time, Angelo Simonini working as a student of Adolf Lieben at the University of Vienna, investigated the reactions of silver carboxylates with iodine.  They found that the products formed are determined by the stoichiometry within the reaction mixture.  Using a carboxylate-to-iodine ratio of 1:1 leads to an alkyl iodide product, in line with Borodin's findings and the modern understanding of the Hunsdiecker reaction.  However, a 2:1 ratio favours the formation of an ester product that arises from decarboxylation of one carboxylate and coupling the resulting alkyl chain with the other.

Using a 3:2 ratio of reactants leads to the formation of a 1:1 mixture of both products.  These processes are sometimes known as the Simonini reaction rather than as modifications of the Hunsdiecker reaction.

3    +   2    →      +      +   2    +   3

Reaction mechanism
In terms of reaction mechanism, the Hunsdiecker reaction is believed to involve organic radical intermediates. The silver salt 1 reacts with bromine to form the acyl hypohalite intermediate 2. Formation of the diradical pair 3 allows for radical decarboxylation to form the diradical pair 4, which recombines to form the organic halide 5. The trend in the yield of the resulting halide is primary > secondary > tertiary.

Variations
Mercuric oxide and bromine convert 3-chlorocyclobutanecarboxylic acid  to 1-bromo-3-chlorocyclobutane. This is known as Cristol-Firth modification. The 1,3-dihalocyclobutanes were key precursors to propellanes. The reaction has been applied to the preparation of ω-bromo esters with chain lengths between five and seventeen carbon atoms, with the preparation of methyl 5-bromovalerate published in Organic Syntheses as an exemplar.

The Kochi reaction is a variation on the Hunsdiecker reaction developed by Jay Kochi that uses lead(IV) acetate and lithium chloride (lithium bromide can also be used) to effect the halogenation and decarboxylation.

Reaction with α,β-unsaturated carboxylic acids 

Chowdhury and Roy noted several drawbacks of using the Hunsdiecker reaction, namely that some reagents, such as molecular bromine and salts of mercury, thallium, lead, and silver, are inherently toxic and that reactions with α,β-unsaturated carboxylic acids result in low yield. Regarding reactions using α,β-unsaturated carboxylic acids, Kuang et al. modified the reaction with using a new halogenating agent, N-halosuccinimide, and lithium acetate as the catalyst, which resulted in higher yield of β-halostyrenes. They found that using microwave irradiation could synthesize (E)-β-arylvinyl halide much quicker with higher yields. This is useful because synthesizing (E)-vinyl bromide in general is not very practical due to the complexity of alternative reagents (e.g. organometallic compounds), longer reaction times, and lower yields. Using microwave irradiation also allows the synthesized arylvinyl halide to carry electron-donating groups (in addition to electron-withdrawing groups), which is not possible with alternative synthetic methods. While tetrabutylammonium trifluoroacetate (TBATFA) could be used as an alternative catalyst for a metal-free reaction, it was noted that lithium acetate resulted in higher yields compared to other relatively complex catalysts, including tetrabutylammonium trifluoroacetate. An alternative method using micelles was found, with green characteristics. Micelles generally facilitate reactions thanks to their solublization capability and here, it was found that a reaction with α,β-unsaturated aromatic carboxylic acids and N-halosuccinimide catalyzed by cetyltrimethylammonium bromide (CTAB), sodium dodecyl sulfate (SDS), and Triton X-100 in dichloroethane (DCE) carried out under reflux conditions of 20–60 minutes formed β-halostyrenes in excellent yields with high regioselectivity.

See also
Barton decarboxylation
Barton–McCombie deoxygenation

References

External links 
 Animation of the reaction mechanism

Free radical reactions
Halogenation reactions
Name reactions